Serge Telle (born 5 May 1955) is a French diplomat. He served as the Minister of State of Monaco.

Early life
Serge Telle was born on 5 May 1955 in Nantes, France. His father was an engineer.

Telle graduated from Sciences Po. He also earned a degree in Swahili from the National Institute for Oriental Languages and Civilizations, and another degree in Community Law.

Career
Telle joined the French Foreign Ministry in 1982, when he first worked as Second Secretary at the Embassy of France, Dar-es-Salam in Dar-es-Salam, Tanzania until 1984. He was the First Secretary at the Permanent Mission of France to the United Nations in New York City from 1984 to 1988. He was a diplomatic advisor to Secretary of State Humanitarian Action Bernard Kouchner from 1988 to 1992. He worked in the Foreign and Commonwealth Office from 1992 to 1993, and at the United Nations Office at Geneva from 1993 to 1997. He was an advisor to Prime Minister Lionel Jospin from 1997 to 2002, with a focus on Middle Eastern and African affairs.

Telle served as Consul General (later Ambassador) of France to Monaco from 2002 to 2007. He was an advisor to Foreign Minister Bernard Kouchner from 2007 to 2008. He was the French ambassador to the Union for the Mediterranean from 2008 to 2012, and the interministerial delegate for the Mediterranean from 2013 to 2015. He was also the president of the Agency for Cities and Territories of the Mediterranean from 2011 to 2016. Telle was appointed Minister of State of Monaco on 1 February 2016, succeeding Michel Roger.

On 16 March 2020 Telle tested positive for COVID-19.

Honours

French honours
 Knight of the National Order of Legion of Honour
 Knight of the National Order of Merit

Monégasque honours
 Commander of the Order of Saint-Charles

Personal life
From his first marriage with Karène Telle, he has 3 children named Anne-Claire, Jean-Baptiste and Antoine. After getting divorced, he met and married Guilaine Chenu, a television presenter. They have a son, Alexis.

References

1955 births
Ambassadors of France to Monaco
Chevaliers of the Légion d'honneur
Knights of the Ordre national du Mérite
Commanders of the Order of Saint-Charles
Living people
Ministers of State of Monaco
Diplomats from Nantes
Sciences Po alumni